Mac Guff  (also known as Mac Guff Ligne) is a French visual effects company based in Los Angeles, United States, Brussels, Belgium and Paris, France, where it is headquartered. Mac Guff specializes in the creation of computer graphics for commercials, music videos and feature films. 270 graphic designers, VFX supervisors and producers, computer engineers, and administrators are usually working on over 100 million files (for Despicable Me). In mid-2011, the company was split in two, and the animation department was acquired by Illumination Entertainment (Universal Studios). The new company was named Illumination Mac Guff (now known as Illumination Studios Paris) and has capital worth 3.2 million euro.

Company name 
The company name Mac Guff was inspired by the term MacGuffin. The director and producer Alfred Hitchcock popularized both the term "MacGuffin" and the technique.

Animated productions 
La Vie des bêtes (1988, design. Philippe Starck)
"Love Don't Let Me Go" (2002, music video for David Guetta dir. Olivier Boscovitch)
Pat & Stan (2003–2006, television series dir. Pierre Coffin)
Azur & Asmar: The Princes' Quest (2006, feature film dir. Michel Ocelot)
Dragon Hunters (2008, feature film dir. Arthur Qwak and Guillaume Ivernel)
Despicable Me (2010, feature film dir.  Pierre Coffin and Chris Renaud)
Home Makeover, Orientation Day, and Banana (2010, short films)
Hop (2011, feature film dir. Tim Hill, Illumination opening logo variant only)
A Monster in Paris  (2011, feature film dir. Bibo Bergeron)
The Lorax (2012, feature film dir. Chris Renaud)
Kirikou and the Men and Women (2012, feature film dir. Michel Ocelot)
Life, Animated (2016, feature film dir. Roger Ross Williams, animated sequences only)
Dilili in Paris (2018, feature film dir. Michel Ocelot)
SamSam (2020, feature film dir. Tanguy de Kermel)
Around the World in 80 Days (2021, feature film dir. Samuel Tourneux)

Features
 1995: La Haine
 1997: Dobermann
 1997: Contact
 1998: Quasimodo d'El Paris
 1998: The Visitors II: The Corridors of Time
 1999: Train de vie
 2000: Cours toujours
 2000: Scènes de crimes
 2001: Vidocq
 2001: Safe Conduct
 2001: G@mer
 2001: Snowboarder
 2001: Le Petit Poucet
 2002: Monsieur Batignole
 2002: Irréversible
 2002: Brocéliande
 2002: Filles perdues, cheveux gras
 2002: Ginostra
 2002: Quelqu'un de bien
 2003: Love Me If You Dare
 2003: Blueberry
 2003: A Species Odyssey (TV)
 2004: L'Américain
 2004: L'Équipier
 2004: Agents secrets
 2004: Arsène Lupin
 2005: La Boîte noire
 2005: Ma vie en l'air
 2005: Danny the Dog
 2005: Joyeux Noël
 2005: Homo sapiens (TV)
 2006: Bandidas
 2006: Azur et Asmar
 2006: Tell No One
 2007: Truands
 2007: La Tête de maman
 2007: 3 Amis
 2007: L'Invité
 2007: 99 francs
 2007: Les Femmes de l'ombre
 2008: Dragon Hunters
 2008: Un conte de Noël
 2008: The First Day of the Rest of Your Life
 2008: Comme les autres
 2008: Mes stars et moi
 2008: Transporter 3
 2008: Largo Winch
 2009: Welcome
 2009: Coco
 2009: Un prophète
 2009: Park Benches
 2009: Happy End
 2009: L'affaire Farewell
 2009: Le Petit Nicolas
 2009: Une affaire d'État
 2009: 22 Bullets
 2009: Coco and Igor
 2009: Splice
 2010: With Love... from the Age of Reason
 2010: Sarah's Key
 2010: Despicable Me
 2011: Hop (Illumination opening logo variant only)
 2011: A Monster in Paris
 2012: The Lorax
 2012: The Gatekeepers
 2012: Taken 2
 2014: Brick Mansions
 2014: 3 Days to Kill
 2015: The Transporter Refueled
 2015: Taken 3
 2016: Life, Animated
 2017: Valerian and the City of a Thousand Planets

References

External links
 

American animation studios
Companies based in Paris
French animation studios
Visual effects companies